1T (zero T) or 0-T may refer to:

0t, or Zero temperature, alternate term for absolute zero
One of several Whyte notations for steam locomotive classifications
0-4-0T, variant of 0-4-0
0-6-0T, variant of 0-6-0
Bristol and Exeter Railway 0-6-0T locomotives
List of preserved Hunslet Austerity 0-6-0ST locomotives
LMS Fowler Class 3F
GWR Sir Watkin Class
0-10-0T, variant of 0-10-0
2-4-0T, variant of 2-4-0
South Devon Railway 2-4-0 locomotives
Highland Railway O Class
2-6-0T, variant of 2-6-0
2-8-0T, variant of 2-8-0
4-4-0T, variant of 4-4-0
Bristol and Exeter Railway 4-4-0T locomotives
4-8-0T, variant of 4-8-0
South African Class 13 4-8-0T+T

See also
T0 (disambiguation)